The 1972 Tampa Spartans football team represented the University of Tampa in the 1972 NCAA College Division football season. It was the Spartans' 36th season and they competed as an NCAA College Division independent. The team was led by head coach Earle Bruce, in his first and only year, and played their home games at Tampa Stadium in Tampa, Florida. They finished with a record of ten wins and two losses (10–2) and with a victory in the Tangerine Bowl over Kent State, which featured future Pro Football Hall of Fame linebacker Jack Lambert and future Missouri coach Gary Pinkel. 

Bruce was hired on February 2, 1972, to serve as the replacement for Bill Fulcher who resigned to become the head coach at Georgia Tech. Bruce departed following the season to become head coach at Iowa State after Johnny Majors was named coach at Pittsburgh.

The Spartans' notable players included John Matuszak, who was selected first overall by the Houston Oilers in the 1973 NFL Draft and later won two Super Bowls with the Oakland Raiders; Freddie Solomon, a receiver on two Super Bowl champion teams with the San Francisco 49ers in the 1980s; and Paul Orndorff, who went on to stardom in the World Wrestling Federation as "Mr. Wonderful".

Schedule

References

Tampa
Tampa Spartans football seasons
Citrus Bowl champion seasons
Tampa Spartans football